Freddie Redd (May 29, 1928 – March 17, 2021) was an American hard-bop pianist and composer. He is best known for writing music to accompany The Connection (1959), a play by Jack Gelber. According to Peter Watrous, writing in The New York Times: "Mr. Redd hung out at jam sessions in the 1950s and played with many of the major figures, Sonny Rollins to Art Blakey, and worked regularly with Charles Mingus. When things got tough, he just moved on, living in Guadalajara, Mexico, and in Paris and London."

Biography
Redd was born and grew up in New York City; after losing his father at the age of one, he was raised by his mother, who moved around Harlem, Brooklyn and other neighborhoods. An autodidact, he began playing the piano at a young age and took to studying jazz seriously when he was 18, after a friend played him a record of "Shaw 'Nuff" by Charlie Parker and Dizzy Gillespie during his military service in Korea (1946–1949).

Upon discharge from the Army in 1949, he worked with drummer Johnny Mills, and then in New York played with Tiny Grimes, Cootie Williams, Oscar Pettiford and the Jive Bombers. In 1954, he played with Art Blakey. Redd toured Sweden in 1956 with Ernestine Anderson and Rolf Ericson.

Redd's most successful project was in the late 1950s when he was invited to compose the music for The Living Theatre's New York stage production of The Connection, which was also used in the subsequent 1961 film. In both play and film he performed as an actor and musician. The theater production was a modest hit and the troupe toured the United States and Europe, performing in New York City, London, and Paris. Redd also led a Blue Note album of his music for the play, featuring on alto sax Jackie McLean, who had also appeared in the play. Redd's success in the theater production, however, did not advance his career in the United States, and shortly afterwards he moved to Europe, spending time in Denmark and France.

He returned to the United States in 1974 and resettled on the West Coast; he became a regular on the San Francisco scene and recorded intermittently until 1990. In 2011, he resettled in Baltimore.

Redd struggled to establish himself commercially; however, musically, his creative lines, particular voicings and innovative compositions solidified his reputation; he worked with such musicians as Jackie McLean, Tina Brooks, Paul Chambers, Howard McGhee, Milt Hinton, Lou Donaldson, Benny Bailey, Charles Mingus, Louis Hayes, Al McKibbon, Billy Higgins, Osie Johnson, Tommy Potter, and Joe Chambers, among others. He even contributed organ to James Taylor's original 1968 recording of "Carolina in My Mind". Redd recorded several albums as leader, including two other Blue Note albums (although the last of these was not issued for many years). In 1989, his three Blue Note albums were reissued as The Complete Blue Note Recordings of Freddie Redd, the liner notes of which quoted Jackie McLean as saying: "You never know what town you'll see [ Freddie ] in. He's always been itinerant. Freddie just appears from time to time, like some wonderful spirit."

Redd completed a European tour in 2013, and two albums he made that year – Reminiscing and (with Butch Warren) Baltimore Jazz Loft were issued in February 2021.

Redd died in New York City on March 17, 2021, aged 92.

Discography

As leader/co-leader 
 1955: Introducing the Freddie Redd Trio (Prestige, 1955) – also released as Piano:East/West (Savoy, 1956) and Movin (Status Prestige, 1965)
 1956: Get Happy with Freddie Redd (Pye Nixa, 1958)
 1956: In Sweden (Baybridge, 1973)
 1957: San Francisco Suite (Riverside, 1957)
 1960: The Music from "The Connection" (Blue Note, 1960)
 1960: Shades of Redd (Blue Note, 1961)
 1961: Redd's Blues (Blue Note, 1988)
 1971: Under Paris Skies (Futura, 1971)
 1977: Straight Ahead! (Interplay, 1978) – also released as Jazz Is (Trio, early 1990s)
 1978: Extemporaneous (Interplay, 1978)
 1985: Lonely City (Uptown, 1989)
 1988: Live at the Studio Grill (Triloka, 1990) – live
 1990: Everybody Loves a Winner (Milestone, 1991)
 1998: Freddie Redd and his International Jazz Connection (Fairplay INJazz, 2001)
 2013: Reminiscing (Bleebop, 2021)
 2013: Butch Warren & Freddie Redd: Baltimore Jazz Loft with Butch Warren (Bleebop, 2021)
 2014: Music for You (Steeplechase, 2015)
 2014-15: With Due Respect (Steeplechase, 2016)

 As sideman With Gene Ammons All Star Sessions (Prestige, 1956) – recorded in 1950-55With Rolf Ericson Rolf Ericson & The American All Stars (Dragon, 1956)With Art Farmer When Farmer Met Gryce (Prestige, 1955)With Tiny Grimes The Complete 1950–1954, Volume 3 (1950) (Blue Moon, 1995) – compilation
 The Complete 1950–1954, Volume 4 (1950–1953) (Blue Moon, 1995) – compilation
 The Complete 1950-1954, Volume 5 (1954) / The Complete 1949 J.B. Summers (Blue Moon, 1995) – compilationWith Howard McGhee Music from the Connection (Felsted, 1960)With Joe Roland'''
 Joltin' Joe Roland (Savoy, 1955) – recorded in 1950-54
 Joe Roland Quintette (Bethlehem, 1955)

References

External links
 Nat Hentoff, From the liner notes of Shades Of Redd, Blue Note.
 Peter Watrous, "Freddie Redd Sums It Up in Three Blue Notes", The New York Times (Archives), September 3, 1989.
 Greg Burk, "Freddie Redd interview, 2005", from LA Weekly, August 6, 2005.
 "Remembering Jazz Pianist Freddie Redd", All Things Considered'', NPR, March 18, 2021.
 
 

1928 births
2021 deaths
American jazz composers
American male jazz composers
American jazz pianists
American male pianists
Hard bop pianists
Blue Note Records artists
Milestone Records artists
Prestige Records artists
Riverside Records artists
African-American jazz musicians
American jazz keyboardists
American expatriates in France
American expatriates in Denmark
20th-century American pianists
21st-century American pianists
20th-century American male musicians
21st-century American male musicians
Jazz musicians from New York (state)
African-American jazz composers
African-American jazz pianists
People from Harlem
Musicians from New York City
20th-century African-American musicians
21st-century African-American musicians